The 1916 Princeton Tigers football team represented Princeton University in the 1916 college football season. The team finished with a 6–2 record under second-year head coach John H. Rush. Princeton guard Frank T. Hogg was selected as a consensus first-team honoree on the 1916 College Football All-America Team. Three other Princeton players (end Charles Highley, center Alfred Gennert, and a tackle with the surname McLean) were selected as first-team honorees by at least one selector in 1916.

Schedule

References

Princeton
Princeton Tigers football seasons
Princeton Tigers football